Collía is one of 17 parishes (administrative divisions) in Parres, a municipality within the province and autonomous community of Asturias, in northern Spain.

Villages
 Collia
 Las Coronas
 Montealea
 Collado de Santo Tomás
 La Vita
 La Salgar
 Bodes

Parishes in Parres